The Eckert–Mauchly Award recognizes contributions to digital systems and computer architecture. It  is known as the computer architecture community’s most prestigious award.  First awarded in 1979, it was named for John Presper Eckert and John William Mauchly, who between 1943 and 1946 collaborated on the design and construction of the first large scale electronic computing machine, known as ENIAC, the Electronic Numerical Integrator and Computer.  A certificate and $5,000 are awarded jointly by the Association for Computing Machinery (ACM) and the IEEE Computer Society for outstanding contributions to the field of computer and digital systems architecture.

Recipients

 1979 Robert S. Barton
 1980 Maurice V. Wilkes 
 1981 Wesley A. Clark
 1982 Gordon C. Bell
 1983 Tom Kilburn
 1984 Jack B. Dennis
 1985 John Cocke
 1986 Harvey G. Cragon
 1987 Gene M. Amdahl
 1988 Daniel P. Siewiorek
 1989 Seymour Cray
 1990 Kenneth E. Batcher
 1991 Burton J. Smith 
 1992 Michael J. Flynn
 1993 David J. Kuck
 1994 James E. Thornton
 1995 John Crawford
 1996 Yale Patt
 1997 Robert Tomasulo
 1998 T. Watanabe
 1999 James E. Smith
 2000 Edward Davidson
 2001 John Hennessy
 2002 Bantwal Ramakrishna "Bob" Rau 
 2003 Joseph A. (Josh) Fisher 
 2004 Frederick P. Brooks 
 2005 Robert P. Colwell 
 2006 James H. Pomerene 
 2007 Mateo Valero
 2008 David Patterson
 2009 Joel Emer
 2010 Bill Dally
 2011 Gurindar S. Sohi
 2012 Algirdas Avizienis
 2013 James R. Goodman
 2014 Trevor Mudge
 2015 Norman Jouppi
 2016 Uri Weiser
 2017 Charles P. Thacker
 2018 Susan J. Eggers
 2019 Mark D. Hill
 2020 Luiz André Barroso
 2021 Margaret Martonosi
 2022 Mark Horowitz

See also

 ACM Special Interest Group on Computer Architecture
 Computer engineering
 Computer science
 Computing
 List of computer science awards

References
 ACM-IEEE CS Eckert-Mauchly Award winners
 Eckert Mauchly Award

Computer science awards
IEEE society and council awards